Robert Lang (born 6 April 1840 at Jessore, India; died 23 March 1908 at Woodham Walter, Essex) was an English amateur cricketer who played first-class cricket from 1860 to 1862 for Cambridge University.

Lang was educated at Harrow, where he captained the cricket team in 1858 and 1859, and at Trinity College, Cambridge. He made 11 appearances in first-class matches: eight for Cambridge and three for the Gentlemen in the Gentlemen v Players series.

By the standards of the day he was considered a "tremendously fast" bowler. In the 1860 match against Oxford University he took 1 for 9 and 5 for 10 to help Cambridge to victory, and in the 1862 match he took 5 for 4 and 4 for 31 in another victory.

Lang became a clergyman in the Church of England. He was clerical secretary of the Church Missionary Society from 1881 to 1892, and Vicar of St Leonard's church in Old Warden in Bedfordshire 1892–1902, Vicar of Dinton in Buckinghamshire from 1903 to 1906, and Rector at Woodham Walter in Essex from 1907 to 1908.

He is buried in the churchyard of St Leonard's church in Old Warden in Bedfordshire, close to his daughter and grandson, Richard Ormonde Shuttleworth. His brother, George, also played first-class cricket.

References

External links
 CricketArchive profile

Further reading
 H S Altham, A History of Cricket, Volume 1 (to 1914), George Allen & Unwin, 1962
 Arthur Haygarth, Scores & Biographies, Volumes 1-11 (1744-1870), Lillywhite, 1862-72

1840 births
1908 deaths
Alumni of Trinity College, Cambridge
19th-century English Anglican priests
English cricketers
English cricketers of 1826 to 1863
Cambridge University cricketers
Gentlemen cricketers
People educated at Harrow School